is a city located in Akita Prefecture, Japan. , the city had an estimated population of  24,045  in 10,398  households, and a population density of 22 persons per km2.

Geography
Semboku is located in the mountains of east-central Akita Prefecture, bordering on Iwate Prefecture and the Ōu Mountains on the east. Lake Tazawa, the deepest lake in Japan, is located in the center of the city borders. Parts of the city are within the borders of the Towada-Hachimantai National Park.

Neighboring municipalities
Akita Prefecture
Akita
Kitaakita
Kazuno
Daisen
Iwate Prefecture
Hachimantai
Shizukuishi
Nishiwaga

Climate
Semboku has a Humid continental climate (Köppen climate classification Dfa) with large seasonal temperature differences, with warm to hot (and often humid) summers and cold (sometimes severely cold) winters. Precipitation is significant throughout the year, but is heaviest from August to October.

Demographics
Per Japanese census data, the population of Semboku peaked in the early 1960s and has since declined to pre-1920 levels.

History
The area of present-day Semboku was part of ancient Dewa Province. During the Edo period, the area came under the control of the Satake clan, who had been relocated to Kubota Domain from their former holdings in Hitachi Province. After the start of the Meiji period, the area became part of Semboku District, Akita Prefecture in 1878. The town of Kakunodate was established on April 1, 1889 with the establishment of the modern municipalities system.

The city of Semboku was established on March 22, 2005, from the merger of the towns of Kakunodate and Tazawako, and the village of Nishiki (all from Semboku District).

Government
Semboku has a mayor-council form of government with a directly elected mayor and a unicameral city legislature of 18 members. The city contributes one member to the Akita Prefectural Assembly.  In terms of national politics, the city is part of the Akita 3rd District of the lower house of the Diet of Japan.

Economy
The economy of Semboku is based on agriculture, forestry and seasonal tourism. The city is a noted producer of craft beer, soy sauce and miso.

One event that attracts many tourists is the Rokugō Kamakura Festival, which is held each February 11 to 15.

Education
Semboku has seven public elementary schools and five public middle schools operated by the city government and one public high school operated by the Akita Prefectural Board of Education. The prefecture also operates a special education school for the handicapped.

Transportation

Railway
 East Japan Railway Company - Akita Shinkansen
  – 
 East Japan Railway Company - Tazawako Line
  -   -   -  - 
Akita Nairiku Jūkan Railway - Akita Nairiku Line
  -  -  -  -  -  -  -  -  -

Highway

Local attractions

 Tamagawa Hot Spring has the highest flow rate of any hot spring in Japan at 150 liters/second, which feeds a 3 meter wide stream with a temperature of 98 degrees C. The water from Tamagawa Hot Spring is also very acidic.
Towada-Hachimantai National Park
Lake Tazawa – the deepest lake in Japan
Ōfuka Onsen
 Kakunodate samurai residences

International relations

Twin towns — Sister cities
Semboku is twinned with:
  Ōmura, Nagasaki, Japan, since July 18, 1979
  Sanuki, Kagawa, Japan, since September 28, 1996
  Shinjō, Yamagata, Japan, since July 27, 1996
  Takahagi, Ibaraki, Japan, since July 27, 1996
  Hitachiōta, Ibaraki, Japan, since November 21, 1998

Noted people from Semboku 
Ayako Fuji, musician
Norihisa Satake, politician
Shigehiro Taguchi, basketball player
Yasuhiko Takahashi, wheel gymnastics acrobat

References

External links

Official Website 
Semboku Sightseeing Info Website

 
Cities in Akita Prefecture